Scoparia autochroa is a moth of the family Crambidae. It was described by Edward Meyrick in 1907. This species is endemic to New Zealand.

The wingspan is 21–23 mm. The forewings are brown sprinkled with dark fuscous. The hindwings are fuscous. Adults have been recorded on wing in November.

References

External links
 Scoparia autochroa in Species Id

Moths described in 1907
Moths of New Zealand
Scorparia
Endemic fauna of New Zealand
Taxa named by Edward Meyrick
Endemic moths of New Zealand